Heather Watson was the defending champion, but lost in the quarterfinals to Johanna Larsson.

Alizé Cornet won the title, defeating Eugenie Bouchard in the final, 6–1, 6–2.

Seeds

Draw

Finals

Top half

Bottom half

Qualifying

Seeds

Qualifiers

Lucky losers

Draw

First qualifier

Second qualifier

Third qualifier

Fourth qualifier

References
 Main Draw
 Qualifying Draw

Hobart International
2016 Hobart International